Ersil Ymeraj (born 6 July 1994) is an Albanian footballer who plays as a midfielder for Dinamo Tirana in the Kategoria e Parë.

Career
Ymeraj joined Superliga outfit Laçi in summer 2019 from relegated Kastrioti Krujë. On 17 January 2020, Ymeraj moved to KF Llapi playing in the Football Superleague of Kosovo, on a deal until the end of the season with an option for one further year. After 9 goals and 2 assist in 15 games, the option was triggered and his contract was extended until June 2021.

References

1994 births
Living people
Footballers from Shkodër
Albanian footballers
Association football midfielders
Albanian expatriate footballers
KF Vllaznia Shkodër players
KS Veleçiku Koplik players
FC Kamza players
KS Kastrioti players
KF Laçi players
KF Llapi players
FK Kukësi players
KF Erzeni players
FK Dinamo Tirana players
Football Superleague of Kosovo players
Kategoria Superiore players
Kategoria e Parë players
Albanian expatriate sportspeople in Kosovo
Expatriate footballers in Kosovo